Marcelo Augusto Tomazini (born December 18, 1978 in São Paulo) is a male breaststroke swimmer from Brazil.

At the 1999 Pan American Games in Winnipeg, Manitoba, Canada, Tomazini teamed with Alexandre Massura, Fernando Scherer, and Gustavo Borges to compete in the 4×100 meter medley.  The team's 3:40.27 time won a gold medal, and broke the South American record. When Tomazini competed in the 200-metre breaststroke, his time of 2:17.04 did not win a medal (finished 4th), but broke the South American record.  In the 100-metre breaststroke, Tomazini also finished 4th, with a time of 1:3.72s.

Tomazini competed in the 1999 FINA 25 meter World Swimming Championships.

In July 2001, Tomazini broke the short-course South American record in the 50-metre breaststroke, with a time of 27.67 seconds, and in the 100-metre breaststroke, doing 1:00.23. On November 17, 2001, he broke the short-course South American record in the 200 meter breaststroke, with a time of 2:10.79.

On March 17, 2002, Tomazini again broke the South American record in the 200-metre breaststroke (Olympic pool), with a time of 2:16.21.

At the 2002 FINA 25 meter World Swimming Championships in Moscow, Russia, Tomazini qualified (but did not swim) in the 50-metre breaststroke semi-finals; finished 18th in the 100-metre breaststroke; and finished 11th in the 200-metre breaststroke.  Tomazini also competed on the Brazilian's 4×100-metre medley, which qualified for the finals, finishing in 7th place.

On May 1, 2002, Tomazini broke the short-course South American record in the 200-metre breaststroke, with a time of 2:10.47 (breaking his own previous record of 2:10.79).

He swam at the 2002 Pan Pacific Swimming Championships, where he finished 8th in the 200-metre breaststroke.

Participating in the 2003 World Aquatics Championships, Tomazini finished 27th in the 200-metre breaststroke.

At the 2003 Pan American Games in Santo Domingo, Dominican Republic, Tomazini won the bronze medal in the 200-metre breaststroke, beating the South American record with a time of 2:15.87.

Records

Tomazini is the former holder of the following records:

Long Course (50 meters):

 Former South American record holder of the 200m breaststroke: 2:15.87, time obtained on August 14, 2003 
 Former South American record holder of the 4 × 100 m medley: 3:40.27, time obtained on August 1999, along with Alexandre Massura, Fernando Scherer and Gustavo Borges

Short course (25 meters):

 Former South American record holder of the 50m breaststroke: 27.67, time obtained on July 6, 2001 
 Former South American record holder of the 100m breaststroke: 1:00.23, time obtained on July 8, 2001 
 Former South American record holder of the 200m breaststroke: 2:10.47, time obtained on May 1, 2002

References
 Folha Online

1978 births
Living people
Brazilian people of Italian descent
Swimmers at the 1999 Pan American Games
Swimmers at the 2003 Pan American Games
Pan American Games gold medalists for Brazil
Pan American Games bronze medalists for Brazil
Brazilian male breaststroke swimmers
Pan American Games medalists in swimming
Medalists at the 1999 Pan American Games
Medalists at the 2003 Pan American Games
Swimmers from São Paulo